The Special Purpose Islamic Regiment (abbreviated SPIR), also known as the al-Jihad-Fi-Sabililah Special Islamic Regiment, was a Chechen organization loosely formed by Chechen warlord Arbi Barayev in 1996. It was regarded as one of the main hostage-taking, kidnapping, and oil-smuggling groups operating in Chechnya during the lawless interwar period that followed the First Chechen War (1994–1996) with Russia. It is most notorious for its role in the October 2002 Moscow theater hostage crisis, when the group took some 800 hostages in the Russian capital; by then, SPIR was headed by Movsar Barayev—the nephew of Arbi (killed in 2001)—and probably never had more than 100 fighters at any given time. It might have received some external assistance from foreign fighters.

During the Moscow theatre hostage crisis, Movsar Barayev and some 40 men and women led by him (dubbed the 29th Suicide Division) that also included members of two other Chechen rebel groups, brought together by Shamil Basayev, were killed in a raid by Russian special forces units Alfa and Vympel after having been incapacitated by the chemical attack that also killed at least 129 of their hostages. The SPIR fighters under Yunadi Turchayev, who became a deputy of Dokka Umarov, also took part in the large-scale raid on central Grozny in 2004, in which more than 100 combatants and civilians were killed.

In 2004, the United States Department of State included "The Special Purpose Islamic Regiment (a.k.a. the Islamic Special Purpose Regiment, a.k.a. the al-Jihad-Fisi-Sabililah Special Islamic Regiment, a.k.a. Islamic Regiment of Special Meaning)" on the Terrorist Exclusion List under the USA PATRIOT Act.

As of 2006 (when the SPIR has had at least seven commanders since it was founded), it reportedly continued to conduct limited guerrilla operations in Chechnya under the leadership of the man known only as Amir Aslan, followed by Amirs Rashid and Abdul-Malik. On 4 June 2008, Alkavkaz website reported that Abdul-Malik and three of his comrades had been killed during a skirmish in a forest near Grozny.

References

External links
Special Purpose Islamic Regiment (GlobalSecurity.org)

Guerrilla organizations
Islamist groups
Jihadist groups
Organizations established in 1996
Paramilitary organizations based in Russia
Crime in Chechnya
Islamic terrorism in Russia
Islamism in Chechnya
Moscow theater hostage crisis